Aidin (Persian: آیدین) /ˈeɪdən'/, also spelled Adin (Hebrew: עדין) /ˈɑːdɪn/, is a modern variation of Aidan and several Celtic language names.

Meanings 

Irish: Little fiery one

Scottish Gaelic: The fiery one

Persian: Holy Light

English: Born of fire

Hebrew: Could be a form of Adam, meaning "man".

Turkic Azeri and Turkish: "enlightened" and "bright"

Related names 
Áed, Áedán, Áedh (Ancient Irish)

Aodhán, Edan Aodhagán (Irish) (Scottish)

Aidin (Persian)

Adin (Hebrew)

Aidan, Aden, Aiden, Aydan, Ayden (English)

Aidenn, Aideyn, Aideynn, Aodan (Gaelic)

Aydin (Turkish)

Ajdin (Bosnian)

Aidano, Aido, Aidini (Italian)

Etymology 
The name Aidin (Adin) is a variation of Aidan, which is derived from the Irish male given name Aodhán, a pet form of Aodh. The personal name Aodh means "fiery" and/or "bringer of fire" and was the name of a Celtic sun god (see Aed).

Other Celtic variants include the Scottish Gaelic given name Aodhàn and the Welsh name Aeddan. The Irish language female equivalent is Aodhnait.

Popularity 
Formerly common only in Ireland, Scotland and Wales, the name and its variants have become popular in Europe, the United States, Israel, Persia, Bosnia and Herzegovina, and Canada. Aidan has been the 57th most popular name in the United States since the start of the year 2000, bestowed on over 62,000 boys, while Aiden ranking 66th, has been used on over 51,000 boys. Other variants are less popular, such as Hayden 88th, Ayden 189th, Aden 333rd, Aydan 808th, and Aidin/Aydin 960th, according to the United States Social Security Database. "Aidan/Aiden" was the most popular boys' name in Canada in 2007. Aidan (or any reasonable variant) as a girl's name does not appear in the top one thousand names for girls from the same database, although it has occasionally been used for girls.

People with the given name 
 Aidin Aghdashloo (born 1940), Iranian painter
 Aidin Bozorgi (born 1989, disappeared 2013), Iranian mountain climber
 Aidin Elmi (born 1986), Indonesian footballer
 Aidin Mahmutović (born 1986), Bosnian footballer
 Aidin Nikkhah Bahrami (1982–2007), Iranian basketball player

See also 
Adin (first name) and Adin (surname)
Aodh (given name)
Aidini
Adin, California

References